Samul nori (사물놀이) is a genre of percussion music that originated in Korea. The word samul means "four objects", while nori means "play". Samul nori is performed with four traditional Korean musical instruments. They are Kkwaenggwari (꽹과리), a small gong; Jing (징), a larger gong; Janggu (장구), an hourglass-shaped drum; and Buk (북), a barrel drum similar to the bass drum.

History 
Samul nori's roots are in Pungmul nori (풍물놀이), meaning "playing Korean traditional percussion instruments", which is a Korean folk genre comprising music, acrobatics, folk dance, and rituals. Samul nori was traditionally performed in rice-farming villages in order to ensure and to celebrate good harvests. Until modern times, nine-tenths of Korea's people were employed in agricultural work, and this genre defined Korean music. Samul nori is the formalized, more modern version of Pungmul nori.

Samul nori started by adapting music from Utdari pungmul (the gut, or shaman ceremony rhythm of the Gyeonggi-do and Chungcheong provinces of South Korea), as well as the genres of Yeongnam folk music and Honam udo gut, combined with more contemporary improvisations, elaborations, and compositions. The original music of these local rhymes is steeped in traditional animism and shamanism but also shows influences from Korean military music and Korean Buddhism. While full Pungmul nori often features the use of wind instruments, Samul nori only features the four aforementioned percussion instruments.

Instruments 
After seeing a Samul nori performance, a poet once described each of the four instruments as a different element of weather: the janggu represents rain; the kkwaenggwari, thunder; the jing, the sounds of the wind; and the buk, clouds.

The Korean philosophy of Chun-Ji-In ("Chun" meaning heaven, "Ji" meaning Earth, and "In" meaning people) is also reflected in these instruments: the buk and janggu (leather) represent the sounds of the earth, while the jing and kkwaenggwari (metal) represent sounds of the heavens and the people playing.

For this reason, Samul nori without the sound of people is considered incomplete. Although it is generally performed indoors as a staged genre, Samul nori depicts the traditional Korean culture, an agricultural society rooted in the natural environment. Samul nori is characterized by strong, accented rhythms, vibrant body movements, and an energetic spirit.

International exposure 
Samul nori has gained international popularity, with many Samul nori bands and camps performing worldwide. Since the 1980s in South Korea, there has been a marked increase in the amount of fusion music, which combines Samul nori and Western instruments. Samul nori was also extensively used in the Korean musical Nanta.

The most famous Samul nori ensemble is the internationally famous South Korean ensemble styled SamulNori, which is credited for bringing the music from a rural folk genre to the contemporary stage. The group was established in February 1978 by janggu player and former Namsadang star performer Kim Duk Soo, along with Kim Young Bae (kkwaenggwari), Choi Tae Hyun (jing), and Lee Jong Dae (buk). Following Kim Young Bae's death in 1985, he was replaced by Choi Jong Sil, and Lee Kwang Soo replaced Lee Jong Dae on the buk.  The group has collaborated and recorded with a number of non-Korean ensembles, most notably in 1987 with the Red Sun jazz band, with one Samul Nori/Red Sun CD selling 70,000 copies. They have also performed in August 2000 at the Earth Celebration International Arts Festival on Sado Island in Japan with the Japanese taiko group Kodo.

[]

Regarding his choice to move from the more traditional outdoor performances to indoor venues, Kim Duk Soo states that at the time he established SamulNori, during the last years of the administration of former South Korean president Park Chung Hee, Korean traditional music was associated with the student movement, and anyone playing such instruments outdoors could be arrested. Thus, he developed the current version of the genre, which is generally presented indoors on concert hall stages.

In 1993, SamulNori expanded to include twenty performers and changed its name to SamulNori Hanullim, Inc. ("Hanullim" meaning "big bang").

Instrumental
Honamudonongak (호남우도농악,湖南右道農樂), Binari(비나리), Seoljanggo play(설장고놀이), 
Pangut(판굿), Gilgunakchilchea(길군악칠채), and so on.

References

External links

 Samullori - Official Seoul City Tourism
 Article about the history of samul nori
 Poongmul in the U.S.
 Information about Pungmul and Pungmul in the U.S.
 European samul nori website
 German samul nori website
 French samul nori website
 SamulNori artist page from Alliance Artist Management
 Interview with Kim Duk Soo about SamulNori

Korean traditional music
Korean styles of music